Åker is the Norwegian and Swedish word for a Field. It may also refer to:

 Åker Ship District, an area in Uppland, Sweden
 Jon Åker (1927–2013), Norwegian hospital director

See also 
 Åkre (disambiguation)
 Aker, Norway, a village in Norway